In Greek mythology, Petraea (Ancient Greek: Πετραίη Petraiê means 'of a rock') may refer to the following characters:

 Petraea, the 'fair' Oceanid, one of the 3,000 water-nymph daughters of the Titans Oceanus and his sister-spouse Tethys.
 Petraea, a surname of Scylla who dwelt in or on a rock.

Notes

References 

 Hesiod, Theogony from The Homeric Hymns and Homerica with an English Translation by Hugh G. Evelyn-White, Cambridge, MA.,Harvard University Press; London, William Heinemann Ltd. 1914. Online version at the Perseus Digital Library. Greek text available from the same website.
Homer, The Odyssey with an English Translation by A.T. Murray, PH.D. in two volumes. Cambridge, MA., Harvard University Press; London, William Heinemann, Ltd. 1919. . Online version at the Perseus Digital Library. Greek text available from the same website.
Kerényi, Carl, The Gods of the Greeks, Thames and Hudson, London, 1951.

Oceanids